Dolores Hidalgo (in full, Dolores Hidalgo Cuna de la Independencia Nacional) is the name of a city and the surrounding municipality in the north-central part of the Mexican state of Guanajuato.

In the census of 2005 the city had a population of 54,843 people, while the municipality had 134,641 inhabitants. The city lies directly in the center of the municipality, which is 1,590 km² (613.9 sq mi) in area and includes numerous small outlying communities, the largest of which is Río Laja.

Dolores Hidalgo was named a Pueblo Mágico (Magic Town) in 2002

History 

The city was a small town known simply as Dolores when Father Miguel Hidalgo y Costilla uttered his famous cry for the independence of Mexico (the Grito de Dolores) there in the early hours of September 16, 1810, in front of Nuestra Señora de los Dolores parish church. After Mexico achieved independence, the town was renamed Dolores Hidalgo in his honor. 

Today Dolores Hidalgo is known primarily for its ceramics industry, started by Father Hidalgo, which provides income to well over half the city's population. The inexpensive and mass-produced output of the town is marketed throughout Latin America and the United States. The central square of the town, in front of Fr Hidalgo's historic church, is a popular tourist spot.

A place of pilgrimage in Dolores Hidalgo for many fans of ranchera and popular music is the tomb of José Alfredo Jiménez, one of the country's most beloved singers and songwriters, as well as one of the most prolific popular songwriters in the history of western music. He is buried in the town cemetery.

Footballer Adolfo "El Bofo" Bautista and USA Olympian Leonel Manzano were born here.

Notable people
Adolfo "El Bofo" Bautista, footballer
José Alfredo Jiménez, Mexican singer
Leonel Manzano, USA Olympian

References

Link to tables of population data from Census of 2005 INEGI: Instituto Nacional de Estadística, Geografía e Informática
Guanajuato Enciclopedia de los Municipios de México

External links

−Dolores Hidalgo Cuna de la Independencia Nacional — Official website.
San Luis De La Paz, Guanajuato Nearby colonial town.
Dolores Hidalgo eGuide to Dolores Hidalgo
Bibliography and Hemerography: Miguel Hidalgo and Costilla.
Miguel Hidalgo and Costilla - Documents of 1810 and 1811.
Chronology of Miguel Hidalgo and Costilla.
Points of interest on the map for Dolores Hidalgo

Populated places in Guanajuato
Municipalities of Guanajuato
Pueblos Mágicos